The Durham West Jr. Lightning are a Canadian Junior women's ice hockey team based in Ajax, Ontario.  The Lightning are members of the Provincial Women's Hockey League of the Ontario Women's Hockey Association.  The Lighting were 2007 PWHL silver medallists and 2006 bronze medallists, and 2013 Ontario Intermediate AA champions and 2006 silver medallists.

History

During the 2005-06 season, Jenn Wakefield led the Lightning to a bronze medal in league playdowns and a silver medal at OWHA Provincials, all while setting a then league record for most goals in a single season (31 in only 27 games).  The next season, Wakefield's record was surpassed fellow Lighting alumni Natalie Spooner (32) as Spooner led the Lightning to their best PWHL playoff result in team history, losing in the league final to the Toronto Jr. Aeros.  Both Wakefield and Spooner are Canada national women's ice hockey team alumni.

In 2013, the Lightning defeated the Mississauga Jr. Chiefs in the OWHA Provincial final to win their first ever championship, 3-2.  All this coming after failing to get past the quarter-final in league playoffs.  The Lightning defeated the league champion Whitby Jr. Wolves 2-0 in the quarter-final and the Stoney Creek Jr. Sabres 3-1 in the semi-final for the opportunity to win the title.

Amongst their numerous team alumni, Ashley Riggs graduated to the NCAA Niagara Purple Eagles women's ice hockey team in 2004, before jumping to the National Women's Hockey League and later the Canadian Women's Hockey League. As a member of the Under-22 Canada national women's ice hockey team Riggs competed in four Air Canada Cups, winning Gold in three of them.  Natalie Spooner graduated to the NCAA Ohio State Buckeyes women's ice hockey team in 2008.  She has competed in multiple IIHF events as a member of the Women's National Team and plays in the CWHL as a member of the Toronto Furies.  In 2008, Jenn Wakefield graduated to the NCAA New Hampshire Wildcats program.  After two seasons she switched to the Boston University Terriers women's ice hockey team.  Wakefield is a National Team member and has played in the CWHL with the Vaughan Flames and now with the Toronto Furies.  Tara Watchorn also graduated to NCAA in 2008 with the Boston University Terriers women's ice hockey team.  She made her debut with the Canadian National Team in 2010 and plays for the Calgary Inferno of the CWHL.

Season-by-season results

Professional and National Team alumni
Ashley Riggs
Natalie Spooner
Saroya Tinker
Jenn Wakefield
Tara Watchorn

References

External links
Jr. Lighting Website
PWHL Website

Provincial Women's Hockey League teams
Ice hockey teams in Ontario